Rajendra Chola III was a brother and rival of Rajaraja Chola III, and came to the Chola throne in 1246 CE. Rajendra began to take effective control over the administration, and epigraphs of Rajendra Chola III indicate there was civil war ending with the death of Rajaraja Chola III. Rajendra's inscriptions laud him as the "cunning hero, who killed Rajaraja after making him wear the double crown for three years".

Northern expeditions 
Rajendra Chola III took bold steps to revive the Chola fortunes. He led successful expeditions to the north as attested by his epigraphs found as far as Cuddappah.

Initial success against the Pandyas 
The king also defeated two Pandya princes, one of whom was Maravarman Sundara Pandya II, and briefly made the Pandyas submit to the Chola overlordship. The Hoysalas, under Vira Someswara, sided with the Pandyas and repulsed the Cholas.

Hostility with the Hoysalas 
The Hoysalas played a divisive role in the politics of the Tamil country during this period. Exploiting the lack of unity among the Tamil kingdoms, they supported one Tamil kingdom against the other to prevent both the Cholas and Pandyas from rising to their full potential. During the period of Rajaraja III, the Hoysalas sided with the Cholas and defeated the Kadava chieftain Kopperunjinga and the Pandyas and established a presence in the Tamil country.

War with Jatavarman Sundara Pandya 
Jatavarman Sundara Pandya I ascended the Pandya throne in 1251.  In the ensuing wars for supremacy, he emerged as the most victorious ruler and the Pandya kingdom reached its zenith in the 13th century during his reign. Jatavarman Sundara Pandya first put an end to Hoysala interference by expelling them from the Kaveri delta and subsequently killed their king Vira Someswara in 1262 AD near Srirangam. He then defeated Kopperunjinga, the Kadava chieftain, and turned him into a vassal. He then defeated Rajendra III and made him acknowledge the Pandya suzerainty. The Pandya then turned his attention to the north and annexed Kanchi by killing the Telugu chief Vijaya Gandagopala. He then marched up to Nellore and celebrated his victories there by doing the virabisheka(anointment of heroes) after defeating the Kakatiya ruler, Ganapati. Meanwhile, his lieutenant Vira Pandya defeated the king of Lanka and obtained the submission of the island nation.

Aftermath the Pandya war 
There are no confirmed reports of Rajendra Chola III having been killed in the battle so he lived in obscurity in Pazhayarai up to 1279, after which there are no inscriptions found of the Cholas. This war marks the end of Cholas reign in Tamil Nadu and the Chola territories were completely absorbed by the Pandyan empire.

Fate of Cholas
After the war, the remaining Chola royal bloods were reduced to the state of being chieftains by the Pandyan forces as a retribution for the enslaving the Pandyans for three centuries in their capital city Madurai.  Many Chola royal bloodlines who were officials and chieftains still ruled a small part of land till the British rule in India whereby they participated in their fight for independence against the British rule. There is mention of a Chola chief called Veerasekhara Chola in the early 16th century (1520 AD) who defeated the Pandyas and occupied Madurai. The Pandyas who were vassals of the Vijayanagar Empire wasted no time and appealed to Krishnadevaraya. The latter then sent his general Nagama Nayak who defeated the Chola but then usurped the throne of Madurai instead of restoring the Pandyas.

Notes 
 Nilakanta Sastri, K. A. (1935). The CōĻas, University of Madras, Madras (Reprinted 1984).
 Nilakanta Sastri, K. A. (1955). A History of South India, OUP, New Delhi (Reprinted 2002).

References

Chola kings
13th-century Indian monarchs